Enriqueta Arvelo Larriva (22 March 1886 – 10 December 1962) was a Venezuelan poet. She is considered to be one of the founders of the women's poetry movement in Venezuela and one of the country's principal avant-garde poets.

Biography
Enriqueta Arvelo Larriva was  born in Barinitas, Venezuela into a wealthy family. She was a sister of the poet Alfredo Arvelo Larriva. Self-taught, she lived most of her life in Barinitas, working as a teacher and nurse on her  family's estate.

She was a member of the Viernes Group of poets. In 1958 she was awarded the Municipal Poetry Prize for her Mandato del canto (1957).

Enriqueta Arvelo Larriva died on 10 December 1962 in Caracas, aged 76.

Works
Voz aislada (Isolated Voice), 1930
El cristal nervioso (The Narrow Mirror), 1931
Poemas de una pena (Poems of Shame) 1942
El canto del recuento (Counting Song) 1949
Mandato del canto; poemas, 1944-1946 (Mandate to Sing), Caracas, 1957
Poemas perseverantes (Persistent Poems), 1963

References

1886 births
1962 deaths
Venezuelan women poets
20th-century Venezuelan poets
20th-century Venezuelan women writers